Jeff Ho Surfboards and Zephyr Productions was a surfboard manufacturing facility and surf shop located in Santa Monica, California, that opened in 1971 and closed in 1976. The building was designated as a City Landmark in 2007.

History
In 1971, Jeff Ho, Skip Engblom and Craig Stecyk opened Jeff Ho Surfboards and Zephyr Productions, a surf shop in Santa Monica, California and also used the south wing of the facility for manufacturing their surfboards. The building is located at 2001–2011 Main Street.
  
The surf shop closed in 1979, and was reopened in 1981 by Nathan Pratt as Horizons West Surf Shop. That shop closed in August 2010. The space reopened as a coffee shop called Dogtown Coffee in August 2012.

Significance

Jeff Ho and Skip Engblom formed the Zephyr Surf Team, made up of local surfers who frequented Pacific Ocean Park in the run-down area of Dogtown. Ho and Engblom later formed the Zephyr Skate Team, which became widely known as Z-Boys and popularized the sport.

The Z-boys were based at the Jeff Ho / Zephyr shop, and it was a regular hang-out for the members. Ronnie Jay was head salesman and Nathan Pratt apprenticed under Jeff Ho, Skip Engblom and Craig Stecyk in surfboard building.

The team included  Jay Adams, Tony Alva, Bob Biniak, Chris Cahill, Paul Constantineau, Shogo Kubo, Jim Muir, Peggy Oki, Dino Sid, Nathan Pratt,  Stacy Peralta, Wentzle Ruml and Allen Sarlo and was the subject of a 2001 documentary film, Dogtown and Z-Boys, and a 2005 biographical film, Lords of Dogtown; both feature the Jeff Ho Zephyr /  Surf Shop.

City Landmark Designation

In 2007, the building housing Horizons West Surf Shop (formerly Jeff Ho Surfboards and Zephyr Productions) was designated to be demolished to construct condominiums. 
Local skaters and surfers, led by Jacob Samuel began fighting to protect the building. On April 9, 2007, an application was filed to designate the building as a City Landmark. 
On May 14, 2007, the Planning and Community Development Department of Santa Monica ruled that the building met the minimum of four eligible criteria and officially designated it as a City Landmark.

References

External links

Official Assessment Application
Zephyr Team KCET Departures Venice

Skateboarding
Landmarks in Santa Monica, California